Matthias Seestern-Pauly (born 28 February 1984) is a German teacher and politician of the Free Democratic Party (FDP) who has been serving as a member of the Bundestag from the state of Lower Saxony since 2017.

Early life and career 
Born in Osnabrück, Seestern-Pauly finished school in 2004 with the Abitur at the Gymnasium Bad Iburg and then completed his civilian service. From 2006 to 2011 Seestern-Pauly studied to become a teacher in Osnabrück and Vechta. He completed his studies as Master of Education in the subjects German and History. After his legal clerkship he worked as a teacher at the Gymnasium Ursulaschule Osnabrück since 2014.

Political career 
Seestern-Pauly became a member of the Bundestag in the 2017 German federal election. 

In parliament, Seestern-Pauly has been serving on the Committee on Family Affairs, Senior Citizens, Women and Youth, where he was his parliamentary group’s coordinator. Since 1 February 2020 he has been chairman of the Children's Commission. He is also an alternate member of the Committee on Education, Research and Technology Assessment. He has served as his parliamentary group's spokesman for child and youth policy (2018–2018) and for families (since 2021).

Other activities 
 Federal Agency for Civic Education (BPB), Member of the Board of Trustees

References

External links 

  
 Bundestag biography 
 

 

 

1984 births
Living people
Members of the Bundestag for Lower Saxony
Members of the Bundestag 2021–2025
Members of the Bundestag 2017–2021
Members of the Bundestag for the Free Democratic Party (Germany)